Bernissart is a municipality of Wallonia located in the province of Hainaut, Belgium. 

On January 1, 2006, Bernissart had a total population of 11,458. The total area is 43.42 km², which gives a population density of 264 inhabitants per km². 

The municipality consists of the following districts: Blaton, Bernissart, Harchies, Pommerœul, and Ville-Pommerœul.

The Iguanodon mine 

In 1878, dozens of Iguanodon skeletons were discovered in a coal mine, at a depth of 322 m (1,056 ft). At the time, their proximity was considered proof that some dinosaurs were herd animals. They were mounted by Louis Dollo and set the standard that was followed for over a century. Nine of the twenty-nine skeletons are currently on display at the Royal Belgian Institute of Natural Sciences, and one at the Bernissart Museum. The two museums even made an error they acknowledge with humour: they displayed the skeletons "standing", suggesting that the dinosaurs were bipedal, which is not the case. Found alongside the Iguanodon skeletons were the remains of plants, fish, and other reptiles, including the crocodyliform Bernissartia. The sediments are considered to belong to the Sainte-Barbe Clays Formation.

References

External links 
 
 "17. The Bernissart Iguanodons, 1884". Linda Hall Library. Paper Dinosaurs, 1824–1969.
  Official web site of Bernissart

Municipalities of Hainaut (province)